Andrew Paul Bryan (born 31 July 1964) is a former English cricketer.  Bryan was a right-handed batsman.  He was born in Birmingham, Warwickshire.

Bryan first played County Cricket for Staffordshire in the 1991 Minor Counties Championship against Cumberland.  From 1991 to 1992, he represented the county in 5 Championship matches, the last of which came against Lincolnshire.

Bryan next appeared in County Cricket when he represented the Worcestershire Cricket Board in 3 List A matches in 2001.  These came against Staffordshire and Cumberland in the 2001 Cheltenham & Gloucester Trophy and against Buckinghamshire in the 1st round of the 2002 Cheltenham & Gloucester Trophy which was played in 2001.  In his 3 List A matches, he scored 3 runs, with a high score of 3*.

References

External links
Andrew Bryan at Cricinfo

1964 births
Living people
Cricketers from Birmingham, West Midlands
English cricketers
Staffordshire cricketers
Worcestershire Cricket Board cricketers
English cricketers of 1969 to 2000
English cricketers of the 21st century